Anthony "Marc" Perrone (born November 14, 1955) is an American labor union leader.

Born in Hearne, Texas, Perrone grew up in Pine Bluff, Arkansas.  He began working in the local branch of Weingarten's when he was 16, and joined the Retail Clerks International Union.  He studied at the University of Arkansas at Little Rock and the University of Arkansas at Pine Bluff, in an attempt to enter medical school, but ended up with a degree in labor studies from Antioch University.

After college, Perrone began working as a union organizer for what soon became the United Food and Commercial Workers.  He held numerous jobs in the union before moving to Washington DC when he was 28, to become assistant to the organizing director.  He then became assistant to the president, then moved to New York City as the regional director, and back to Washington, where he held various director positions.  In 2004, he was elected as secretary-treasurer of the union, and then in 2014, as president.

As leader of the union, Perrone focused on reducing its pension liabilities, and on listening to the rank-and-file members of the union.

References

1955 births
Living people
Antioch University
University of Arkansas at Little Rock alumni
University of Arkansas at Pine Bluff alumni
People from Hearne, Texas
Trade unionists from Texas